Mollaisaqlı (also, Molla-Isakhly and Mollaisakly) is a village and municipality in the Ismailli Rayon of Azerbaijan.  It has a population of 1,051.

References 

Populated places in Ismayilli District